Joseph Burr Tyrrell, FRSC (November 1, 1858 – August 26, 1957) was a Canadian geologist, cartographer, and mining consultant. He discovered dinosaur (Albertosaurus sarcophagus) bones in Alberta's Badlands and coal around Drumheller in 1884. Canada's Royal Tyrrell Museum of Palaeontology in Alberta was named in his honor.

Tyrrell was born in Weston, Ontario, the third child of William and Elizabeth Tyrrell. He was the brother of Canadian explorer and author James William Tyrrell. He was a student at Weston Grammar School before graduating from Upper Canada College in 1876 and receiving a law degree from the University of Toronto in 1880. After articling for a law firm in Toronto, his doctor advised him to work outdoors due to his health.

He joined the Geological Survey of Canada in 1880, leading or participating in numerous explorations. 

His book A Brief Narrative of the Journeys of David Thompson was published in 1888. That same year his book The Mammalia of Canada was also published.

He led the 1893 and 1894 expeditions into the Northern Barren Lands, down the Dubawnt River, the first visit to the Kivalliq Region Barrenlands by a European since the explorations of Samuel Hearne in the 1770s. His younger brother, James Williams Tyrrell, accompanied Tyrrell on the expedition, which included the first European contact with the Ihalmiut, Inuit from the interior of what is today Nunavut.

Tyrrell married Mary Edith Carey in 1894 and they had three children, Mary (1896), George (1900), and Thomas (1906). Mary Edith was the founder and first president in 1921 of the Women's Association of the Mining Industry of Canada. 

In 1894, Tyrrell stumbled upon biographical recollections (11 books of field notes, 39 journals, maps, and a narrative) of Canadian overland explorer, cartographer, and fur trader David Thompson and, in 1916, published them as David Thompson's Narrative.

Tyrrell went into the gold-mining business in 1898, a career that would last more than 50 years. In his work he published several books on gold fields. In 1912 he published The Law of the Pay-streak in Placer Deposits.

He was the mine manager of the Kirkland Lake Gold Mine in northern Ontario for many years starting in 1926.

Tyrrell retired to northeast Scarborough on the Rouge River, where he established substantial apple orchards and an interest in grafting and breeding. The expanded orchards, later managed by his son George, are now the site of the Toronto Zoo. 

He died in Toronto in 1957 at the age of 98.

Honours and awards

Places named for Tyrrell
 Tyrrell Sea (prehistoric Hudson Bay)
 Tyrrell Arm, the east section of Yathkyed Lake, Nunavut
 Joseph Burr Tyrrell Park, Toronto, Ontario
 Tyrrell Lake, a small alkali lake near Warner, Alberta.

Institutions named for Tyrrell
 Royal Tyrrell Museum of Palaeontology, Drumheller, Alberta
 J. B. Tyrrell Senior Public School in Scarborough, Ontario
 Joseph Burr Tyrrell Elementary School in Fort Smith, Northwest Territories

Awards
 1896 Back Award, Royal Geographical Society
 1918 Murchison Medal, Geological Society of London
 1929 Honorary President, Royal Canadian Geographical Society
 1930 Daly Medal from the American Geographical Society
 1933 Flavelle Medal, Royal Society of Canada
 1947 Wollaston Medal, Geological Society of London
 1954 Professional Engineer's Medal from the Association of Professional Engineers of Ontario
 1997 Canadian Mining Hall of Fame

Other honours
 J.B. Tyrrell Historical Medal, Royal Society of Canada.

Tribute
On 1 November 2018, Google Doodle commemorated his 160th birthday.

References

Further reading
 
 Historica minute
 
A biography by Heather Robertson, 2007, Measuring Mother Earth: How Joe the Kid became Tyrrell of the North, McClelland & Stewart Inc.

External links

 Royal Tyrrell Museum website
 Scientist of the Day-Joseph Burr Tyrrell at Linda Hall Library

 
 The History of the Geological Survey of Canada in 175 Objects
 Joseph Burr Tyrrell  at The Canadian Encyclopedia
Historica’s Heritage Minute video docudrama about Joseph Tyrrell. (Adobe Flash Player.)
 Joseph Burr Tyrrell Papers, Thomas Fisher Rare Book Library 
 L’histoire de la Commission géologique du Canada illustrée par 175 objets

1858 births
1957 deaths
Canadian geologists
Canadian paleontologists
Geological Survey of Canada personnel
Fellows of the Royal Society of Canada
University of Toronto alumni
Upper Canada College alumni
Wollaston Medal winners
People from Kirkland Lake
People from Weston, Toronto
Persons of National Historic Significance (Canada)
Paleontology in Ontario
Burials at Toronto Necropolis